Japonaise is the French word for "Japanese woman"

Japonaise or La Japonaise may refer to:
 La Japonaise (painting), by Claude Monet 1876
 La Japonaise (Meg album)
 "La Japonaise", song by Freddie Mercury with Montserrat Caballé